Bathyamaryllis is a genus of amphipods belonging to the family Amaryllididae. The genus was first described in 1933 by Jean M. Pirlot, and the type species is Bathyamaryllis perezii Pirlot, 1933.

Species:
Bathyamaryllis biscayensis 
Bathyamaryllis haswelli 
Bathyamaryllis kapala 
Bathyamaryllis ouvea 
Bathyamaryllis perezii 
Bathyamaryllis pulchellus

References

External links
Bathyamaryllis occurrence data from GBIF

Amphipoda
Malacostraca genera
Crustaceans described in 1933